WIWI-LP (99.7 FM) is a non-commercial low-power FM radio station licensed to Milwaukee, Wisconsin. The station is owned by Milwaukee Hispanic Radio, Inc.

References

External links

IWI-LP
IWI-LP
Community radio stations in the United States